Zhang Xiaobin (born 23 October 1993) is a Chinese footballer who plays as a  defensive midfielder for Wuhan Three Towns.

Club career
Zhang Xiaobin started his football career with Jiangsu Sainty during the 2014 season   after playing for Jiangsu Youth during the 2011 season  and the 2012 season. On 23 July 2014, Zhang made his debut for Jiangsu Sainty in the 2014 Chinese FA Cup against Lijiang Jiayunhao, coming on as a substitute for Ji Xiang. On 26 October 2014, he made his Super League debut in the 2014 Chinese Super League against Shanghai East Asia. He scored his first and very decisive goal in CSL on 15 August 2015, when Jiangsu beat Shanghai Shenxin 1–0.

On 13 February 2019, Zhang was loaned to fellow first-tier club Tianjin Tianhai for the 2019 season. On 1 March 2019, he made his debut for the club in a 3–0 away defeat against Guangzhou Evergrande. On his return to Jiangsu he would be part of the squad that helped aid the club win the 2020 Chinese Super League title. On 28 February 2021, the parent company of the club Suning Holdings Group announced that operations were going to cease immediately due to financial difficulties.

On 6 April 2021, Zhang joined second tier club Wuhan Three Towns on a free transfer. In his debut season he would go on to establish himself as a vital member of the team and help aid the club to win the league title and gain promotion as the club entered the top tier for the first time in their history. The following campaign he would be part of the squad that won the 2022 Chinese Super League title.

International career
Zhang was called up to the senior China squad for the 2018 FIFA World Cup qualification – AFC Third Round.

Career statistics

Statistics accurate as of match played 11 January 2023.

Honours

Club
Jiangsu Sainty
Chinese Super League: 2020
Chinese FA Cup: 2015

Wuhan Three Towns
Chinese Super League: 2022.
China League One: 2021

References

External links
 

1993 births
Living people
Sportspeople from Nantong
Chinese footballers
Footballers from Jiangsu
Jiangsu F.C. players
Tianjin Tianhai F.C. players
Chinese Super League players
China League Two players
Association football midfielders